The 2000 Wismilak International was a women's tennis tournament played on outdoor hard courts in Kuala Lumpur, Malaysia that was part of the Tier III category of the 2000 WTA Tour. It was the sixth edition of the tournament and was held from 6 November through 12 November 2000. Unseeded Henrieta Nagyová won the singles title and earned $27,573 first-prize money.

Finals

Singles
 Henrieta Nagyová defeated  Iva Majoli, 6–4, 6–2
 It was Nagyová's 3rd singles title of the year and the 8th of her career.

Doubles
 Henrieta Nagyová /  Sylvia Plischke defeated  Liezel Horn /  Vanessa Webb, 6–4, 7–6(7–4)

References

External links
 ITF tournament edition details
 Tournament draws

Wismilak International
Commonwealth Bank Tennis Classic
2000 in Malaysian tennis